Talkhab-e Nazer (also Romanized as Talkhāb-e Naẓer; also known as Talkhāb) is a village in Abezhdan Rural District, Abezhdan District, Andika County, Khuzestan Province, Iran. At the 2006 census, its population was 502, in 89 families.

References 

Populated places in Andika County